Kip Gamblin (born 5 July 1975) is an Australian ballet dancer and actor. From 2003 until 2005, Gamblin played Scott Hunter in Home and Away. The part earned him the 2004 Logie Award for Most Popular New Male Talent. After moving to the UK, Gamblin was cast as paramedic Greg Fallon in the medical drama series Casualty. Following his move back to Australia, Gamblin starred in All Saints and Dance Academy. In 2013, Gamblin began appearing in Neighbours as Brad Willis, making him the third actor to play the role after Benjamin Grant Mitchell and Scott Michaelson. He made his final appearance in that role on 7 April 2017.

Career

Gamblin trained as a ballet dancer at The McDonald College of Performing Arts, Sydney and completed his training at the Australian Ballet School, Melbourne. He  performed with the Australian Ballet, the West Australian Ballet and the Sydney Dance Company between 1994 and 2002, and had leading roles in Paquita and Le Corsaire among many other ballet productions. In 2000 he was chosen to perform as the sole male dancer presenting Barbra Streisand on stage for her Australian tour of Timeless.

Film credits for Gamblin include the 2001 film Moulin Rouge!, in which he played a Latin dancer and the Australian feature films Kick and Mao's Last Dancer. From January 2003 to November 2005 Gamblin played the role of Scott Hunter in the Australian television soap opera Home and Away for which he won the Logie Award for Most Popular New Male Talent in 2004. He departed the series in the 2005 season finale.

Gamblin moved to Great Britain with his family in 2005, but has since moved back to Australia. From June 2006 to 2008 he played the role of paramedic Greg Fallon in the British medical series Casualty. He also made an appearance as Greg Fallon in Holby City, when the character was one of the paramedics who attended the scene of Mark and Tricia Williams' car accident. In 2008, Gamblin portrayed the role of Dr Adam Rossi in the Australian medical series All Saints. In 2010, Gamblin joined the cast of Australian teen drama series Dance Academy as male dance instructor Zach.

In 2012, Gamblin portrayed the role of Rick Taylor in the Australian television drama series Tricky Business which lasted for one season. In May 2013, Gamblin took over the role of Brad Willis from Scott Michaelson in the Australian television soap opera Neighbours. Gamblin departed the show on 7 April 2017. He filmed his final scenes in late 2016. Gamblin joined the 2017 Australian touring production of The Bodyguard musical as Frank Farmer, alongside Paulini. The production opened on 21 April at the Sydney Lyric.

Personal life
Gamblin is married to dancer Linda Ridgway and they have two sons.

Filmography

References

External links

1975 births
Australian Ballet School alumni
Australian male ballet dancers
Australian male soap opera actors
Living people
Logie Award winners
Place of birth missing (living people)